Malcolm Haynie Myers (June 19, 1917 – March 14, 2002) was an American painter, printmaker and professor known primarily for his Intaglio-style engravings. His work is included in numerous museum collections.

Early life and education 

Myers was born in June 19, 1917 in Lucerne, Missouri. He grew up there until his early teen years, when his family moved to West Texas during the Great Depression so his father could work in the oil fields near McCamey, Texas. They stayed there until the mid-1930s when they moved to the Wichita, Kansas area.

With help from a family friend, Myers entered the art program at Wichita State University, where he studied under renowned landscape, seascape, and still-life painter Clayton Staples. He completed a bachelor of fine arts degree from Wichita State University in 1939 and continued on to earn his master of fine arts degree in watercolor in 1941.

After graduation, Myers joined the US Merchant Marine to fight in World War II. He trained at Catalina Island, California, and attended Officers School in Sheepshead Bay, New York. During this time, Myers married his longtime Kansas girlfriend Roberta King. 

After the war, they stayed on in New York City, where he explored his interest in jazz and blues, which were influential in his works of art. He enrolled in graduate school at the University of Iowa in Iowa City to study under painter Grant Wood. During his studies at Iowa, he met Argentinean Print Master Mauricio Lasansky—known as “the nation’s most influential printmaker”—who was there on a Guggenheim fellowship. Myers taught with Lasansky for two years and eventually became a master printmaker himself. In 1946, Myers earned a second master of fine arts degree, this time in printmaking.

Career
In 1948 he joined the art faculty at the University of Minnesota. There, he started the printmaking department in Jones Hall.

In 1950, Myers received a Guggenheim Fellowship and worked in Stanley William (Bill) Hayter’s iconic printmaking studio, Atelier 17, in Paris. There, he met and collaborated with Jaques Desjobert, Joan Miró, Enrique Zañartu, and other artists who were involved in the art of printmaking. 

Then, in 1954, Myers received a second Guggenheim Fellowship, this time to work in Mexico City, Mexico. There, he met Diego Rivera and became interested in pre-Columbian art. He also renewed his friendship with Mexican painter Rufino Tamayo, whom he had met in Paris at Jacques Desjobert & Sons, a famous lithography workshop.[4]

Personal life
When his wife Roberta passed away in 1992, Myers stopped traveling to focus on his art and teaching. In 1996, Myers married artist Marilyn Jenneman. He continued teaching and conducted two or more classes each semester at the University of Minnesota until his death. He died March 14, 2002, aged 84.

Awards and honors 
1950 John Simon Guggenheim Fellowship
1954 John Simon Guggenheim Fellowship
1973 Wichita State University, Alumni Achievement Award
1986 Marquis Who’s Who in America

Collections 
 The Brooklyn Museum, New York, NY
 Cincinnati Art Museum, OH
 Coos Art Museum, Coos Bay, OR
 National Gallery of Art, Washington, D.C.
 The Minneapolis Institute of Arts, Minneapolis, MN
 The New York Public Library, New York, NY
Indianapolis Museum of Art
 Philadelphia Museum of Art, Philadelphia, PA
 Rochester Art Center, Rochester, MN
 St. Olaf College, Northfield, MN
 Ulrich Museum of Art, Wichita State University, Wichita, Kansas
 Seattle Art Museum, Seattle, WA
 Walker Art Center, Minneapolis, MN
 Weisman Museum, University of Minnesota, MN
 Wichita Art Museum, Wichita, KS
 Bibliotheque Nationale, Paris, France
 Jilin University, Changchun, China
 United States Embassy, Bonn, Germany
 University of Iceland, Reykjavik, Iceland
 St. Catherine University

Solo exhibitions 

1949   The College of St. Catherine, St. Paul, MN
1949 Walker Art Center, Minneapolis, MN
1952   Harriet Hanley Gallery, Minneapolis, MN
1952   High Acre Gallery, Minneapolis, MN
1952   Walker Art Center, Minneapolis, MN
1953   University Gallery, University of Minnesota, Minneapolis, MN
1953   Walker Art Center, Minneapolis, MN
1955   Wichita State University, Wichita, KS
1956   Hamline University, St. Paul, MN
1957   University of Ohio, Columbus, OH
1958   The Minneapolis Institute of Arts, Minneapolis, MN
1960   Carleton College, Northfield, MN
1960 Pratt Creative Graphic Workshop, New York
1962   Walker Art Center, Minneapolis, MN
1964   University of Minnesota, Morris, MN
1964 Bethel College and Seminary, St. Paul, MN
1965   University of Alaska, Fairbanks, AK
1965 Wichita Art Museum, Kansas, KS
1966   Carleton College, Northfield, MN
1966 Hamline University, St. Paul, MN
1966 Mulvane Art Center, Topeka, KS
1967   Stout State University, Menomonie, WI
1971   The College of St. Catherine, St. Paul, MN
1977   Art Lending Gallery, Minneapolis, MN
1981   The President's Office, University of Minnesota, Minneapolis, MN
1982   University Gallery, University of Minnesota, Minneapolis, MN
1983   Dolly Fiterman Gallery, Minneapolis, MN
1985   Dolly Fiterman Gallery, Minneapolis, MN
1987   Dolly Fiterman Gallery, Minneapolis, MN
2013, 2015   Grand Hand Gallery, St. Paul, MN
2022 "Myers Paintings" Rubine Red Gallery, Palm Springs, CA

References

External links 
Official website

1917 births
2002 deaths
Artists from Missouri
20th-century American printmakers